The Second Dunstan Ministry was the 51st ministry of the Government of Victoria. It was led by the Premier of Victoria, Albert Dunstan. The ministry was sworn in on 18 September 1943, just several days after the formation of the First Cain Ministry, and consisted of members of the Country Party and the United Australia Party (UAP) (later the Liberal Party from March 1945).

Portfolios

References

Victoria (Australia) ministries
Ministries of George VI